Hotel Agrabad is a first four-star and leading hotel located at Agrabad in Chittagong, Bangladesh.

It was established in 1969 in Sabder Ali Road named after Agrabad, a downtown commercial and financial area in the city.

Description
There is a total of 101 luxurious rooms and suites, a swimming pool and bars.

References

External links

Hotel buildings completed in 1969
Hotels established in 1969
Agrabad
Hotels in Bangladesh